Harold Earl "Hal" Bamberger (October 29, 1924 – November 14, 2010) was an outfielder in Major League Baseball who played briefly for the New York Giants during the  season. He was born in Lebanon, Pennsylvania.

Bamberger graduated from Cornwall High School in Lebanon City and went on to serve in the U.S. Marine Corps for three years, mostly in the South Pacific theatre during World War II. An outstanding athlete at Cornwall, he earned letters in four sports.

In seven games with the Giants of Leo Durocher, Bamberger posted a .083 batting average (1-for-12) without scoring any runs or registering any RBI. He also spent eight years in the minor leagues, in 1942, and from 1946 to 1952, compiling a .287 average and 54 home runs in 771 games. He also managed for Class-C Muskogee Giants, in 1951, and for the Reamstown team in the Lebanon-Lancaster League.

Following his baseball career, Bamberger worked as a general foreman for Grace Mines during 30 years. He then worked six years at Hopewell Culture National Historical Park.

Bamberger died in Reading, Pennsylvania, aged 86, in 2010.

See also
1948 New York Giants season

Sources

External sources

1924 births
2010 deaths
Major League Baseball outfielders
New York Giants (NL) players
Birmingham Barons players
Columbia Reds players
Dallas Eagles players
Jacksonville Tars players
Jersey City Giants players
Lancaster Red Roses players
Minneapolis Millers (baseball) players
Muskogee Giants players
Shelby Cubs players
Trenton Giants players
Tulsa Oilers (baseball) players
Minor league baseball managers
United States Marine Corps personnel of World War II
Baseball players from Pennsylvania
Concord Weavers players
Hornell Maples players